Maxine Paetro is an American author who has been published since 1979.  Paetro has collaborated with best-selling author James Patterson on the Women’s Murder Club novel series and standalone novels.

Biography
From 1975 until 1987, Paetro was a recruiter and EVP creative department manager at several large New York City advertising agencies. In 1979, Paetro published her first book, How to Put Your Book Together and Get a Job in Advertising, which received its fourth revision in August 2010. This non-fiction work has been described as “the advertising industry bible and ultimate insider's guide to getting in and getting noticed".

Between 1986 and 1992, she published three novels: Manshare, Baby Dreams, and Windfall. In 1993, she collaborated with Dodd Darin to write the biography Dream Lovers: The Magnificent Shattered Lives of Bobby Darin and Sandra Dee.

In 2005, she began the first of more than a dozen collaborations with best-selling author James Patterson, co-writing 4th of July for the Women’s Murder Club series. Paetro explains in an interview that she and Patterson (who had also worked in advertising before becoming a full-time writer) had known each other since the 1970s. According to British newspaper The Sunday Times, of authors with the most titles to be at number one on The Sunday Times bestseller list over the past forty years, she ranks #16 with eleven separate titles in the #1 position.

Her garden, Broccoli Hall, has been featured in national magazines including House & Garden, Victoria, Country Garden and Country Homes. Broccoli Hall is on the Garden Conservancy Open Days Program.

In 2008, Paetro began a project to refine and develop a unique variety of koi known as Ki Shusui. The project developed a cult following and continues to this day. Her exploits can be followed on Koiphen, the largest board for koi hobbyists.

Paetro is married to former surety bond executive, John A. Duffy, the now founder and CEO of consulting company, Manhattan Bridge, LLC.

Bibliography
 How to Put Your Book Together and Get a Job in Advertising (1979, nonfiction)
 Manshare (1986)
 Baby Dreams (1989)
 Windfall (1992)
 Dream Lovers: The Magnificent Shattered Lives of Bobby Darin and Sandra Dee (1993, with Dodd Darin)
 Swimsuit (2009, with James Patterson)
 Woman of God (2016, with James Patterson)

Women’s Murder Club
Four San Francisco friends – a detective, a district attorney, a medical examiner, and a crime reporter – join forces to solve mysteries.  Paetro co-authored these books with James Patterson beginning with the fourth book in the series. All are New York Times #1 best-sellers.
 4th of July (2005, with James Patterson) 
 The 5th Horseman (2006, with James Patterson) 
 The 6th Target (2007, with James Patterson) 
 7th Heaven (2008, with James Patterson) 
 8th Confession (2009, with James Patterson) 
 The 9th Judgment (2010, with James Patterson) (title change from 9th Victim) 
 10th Anniversary (2011, with James Patterson)
 11th Hour (2012, with James Patterson)
 12th of Never (2013, with James Patterson)
 Unlucky 13 (2014, with James Patterson)
 14th Deadly Sin (2015, with James Patterson)
 15th Affair (2016, with James Patterson)
 16th Seduction (2017, with James Patterson)
 17th Suspect (2018, with James Patterson)
 18th Abduction (2019, with James Patterson)
 19th Christmas (2019, with James Patterson)
 The 20th Victim (2020, with James Patterson)
 21st Birthday (2021, with James Patterson)
 22 Seconds (2022, with James Patterson)
 23rd Midnight (2023, with James Patterson)

Jack Morgan
 Private (2010, with James Patterson)
 Private: #1 Suspect (2012, with James Patterson)
 Private Vegas (2015, with James Patterson)

Confessions 
The Confessions series is about 16-year-old Tandoori Angel. She lives in New York City's Upper West Side in the famed Dakota. In the first book, she tries to solve the double homicide of her parents, while coping with shocking discoveries about her family and their company, Angel Pharma. In the second book, she tries finding her lost love, James Rampling, and as her memories of him become clearer and clearer, she comes closer to finding him.  
 Confessions of a Murder Suspect (2012, with James Patterson)
 Confessions: The Private School Murders (2013, with James Patterson)
 Confessions: The Paris Mysteries (2014, with James Patterson)
 Confessions: The Murder of an Angel (2015, with James Patterson)

References

External links
Broccoli Hall website
Ki Shusui website

American women novelists
Living people
20th-century American novelists
20th-century American women writers
21st-century American novelists
21st-century American women writers
American mystery novelists
Women mystery writers
Year of birth missing (living people)